Ecuador competed in the 2015 Parapan American Games.

Competitors
The following table lists Ecuador's delegation per sport and gender.

Medalists
The following competitors from Ecuador won medals at the games. In the by discipline sections below, medalists' names are bolded.

|  style="text-align:left; width:78%; vertical-align:top;"|

|  style="text-align:left; width:22%; vertical-align:top;"|

Athletics

Ecuador sent six male athletes to compete.

Men

Field events

Powerlifting

Ecuador sent one athlete to compete.

Swimming

Ecuador sent two male and one female swimmers to compete.

Table tennis

Ecuador sent two male table tennis players to compete.

Wheelchair tennis

Ecuador sent one male athlete to compete.

References

Nations at the 2015 Parapan American Games